Carl With may refer to:

 Carl Johannes With (1877–1923), Danish doctor and arachnologist
 Carl Georg With (1827–1908), Norwegian military officer